Alice Louise Reynolds (April 1, 1873 – December 5, 1938) was a Brigham Young University (BYU) professor. She was the second woman in Utah to be named a full professor.

Childhood and education
Reynolds was born in Salt Lake City, Utah Territory, United States, to George Reynolds and Mary Ann Tuddenham. Her father, George Reynolds, was a general authority of the Church of Jesus Christ of Latter-day Saints (LDS Church), and a longtime secretary to the First Presidency of the church. When Alice was six years old, George was incarcerated for two years because he practiced plural marriage.

At the age of four she attended a private school taught by Izzie Calder, daughter of David O. Calder. George's sister Julia Reynolds helped look after Alice during her childhood. Alice enjoyed reading and the company of other grownups. At age 12, Alice's mother died in childbirth. Her teacher at the Twentieth Ward school, T.B. Lewis, left to become the principal of Ogden High School. The combination of these two events led George to send Alice and her younger sister Florence to the Brigham Young Academy (BYA) for high school. She was greatly motivated by the teachings of one of her instructors, Academy Principal Karl G. Maeser. She graduated from BYA in 1890.

After teaching for two years, the president of BYA, Benjamin Cluff, suggested that she establish a literature department at BYA after furthering her studies. Reynolds studied literature at the University of Michigan from 1892 to 1894, during which time she closely associated with Richard R. Lyman and Joseph F. Merrill the later of whom was her branch president. In 1894, she received the promised faculty appointment at BYA.

She received a Bachelor of Pedagogy degree in 1895, . followed by a   Bachelor of Didactics from the Church Board of Education in 1897 and a Bachelor of Arts degree from BYU in 1910. She later pursued advanced study at Chicago, Cornell, Berkeley and Columbia, and made four trips to Europe in 1906, 1910, 1924, and 1937.

Career

Teaching

Reynolds began her teaching career after graduating from BYA. She taught for a year at the Salt Lake 14th Ward Seminary and at Juab Stake Academy. She was 21 when she accepted a position at BYA.

Reynolds was a Professor of English from 1894 to 1938. She was the first woman at BYA to teach college-level classes. She taught literature there until 1903 when the school was replaced by Brigham Young High School and BYU. She became the first woman to be a full professor at BYU. She taught approximately 5,000 students in 20 different English courses. Reynolds's absent-mindedness was legendary at BYU. According to her students, she once walked through a herd of cows while reading a book and brought a teakettle to work instead of her purse. Despite her reputation for absent-mindedness, Reynolds exuded confidence and self-respect. 

Reynolds was an editor for the Relief Society Magazine from 1923 to 1930. She also wrote for the Young Woman's Journal, the Improvement Era, and The Instructor. Reynolds was also called to the General Board of the Relief Society of The LDS Church in 1923. She served for seven years.

Contributions to library
At BYA, Reynolds served as a member of a faculty committee to establish the library. The committee formed in 1906, and Reynolds served as its chairperson for 19 years. Part of her work on the committee included a large fundraiser to obtain 1,200 books to add to the school's library. Over the course of her life, she organized several other campaigns to help the library grow to 100,000 volumes. On February 19, 1933, the Alice Louise Reynolds Club was formally established with a written constitution and by-laws established by a central committee. Through the efforts of the club, over 10,000 volumes were donated to the BYU library.

Involvement in politics

In politics, Reynolds was an active Democrat, serving on the national party's committee and as a delegate to the party's national convention. She was a delegate to the General Federation of Women's Clubs, the National American Women Suffrage Conventions, and the League of Women Voters at the Pan American Convention. At the General Federation of Women's Clubs, in response to accusations that The LDS Church dictated how members must vote, Reynolds stated that her religion did not interfere with her voting as a Democrat. In 1920, as a delegate to the National Democratic Convention, she made a speech seconding the nomination for William Gibbs McAdoo for President.

Reynolds died of cancer at the age of 65.

Legacy
The auditorium in the Harold B. Lee Library is named after Reynolds. In the mid-20th century several cities in Utah, including St. George, had women's literary clubs named after Reynolds.

Starting in 1978, women in Provo revived the Alice Louise Reynolds club in the form of the Alice Louise Reynolds forum, which discussed issues related to Mormon feminism, including their support for the Equal Rights Amendment. In 1984 they changed their name to the Algie Eggertsen Ballif forum.

Publications

Articles

The Editor Abroad

References

External links

 Alice Louise Reynolds papers, MSS 120 at L. Tom Perry Special Collections, Harold B. Lee Library, Brigham Young University
 Alice Louise Reynolds digitized diaries at L. Tom Perry Special Collections, BYU
 Text transcription of Alice Louise Reynolds diaries
 Alice Louise Reynolds Women-in-Scholarship Lecture Series

1873 births
1938 deaths
American leaders of the Church of Jesus Christ of Latter-day Saints
Brigham Young Academy alumni
Brigham Young University faculty
Burials at Salt Lake City Cemetery
Editors of Latter Day Saint publications
Mormon feminists
University of Michigan alumni
Utah Democrats
Relief Society people
20th-century American women politicians
20th-century American politicians
Harold B. Lee Library-related University Archives articles